Mandwa may refer to the following places in India:

 Mandva, or Mandwa, a village and former princely state in Gujarat
 Mandwa, Maharashtra, in Raigad district
 Mandwa, Nepanagar, in Burhanpur district in Madhya Pradesh
 Mandwa, Parbhani, in Parbhani district of Maharashtra 
 Mandwa, site of the Mandwa Waterfalls in Bastar district in Chhattisgarh